Neuland: Antireligiöse Zweiwochenschrift der Sowjetdeutschen (translation of the name: "The Virgin Land", or "The New Land":  "Antireligious two-week publication of the Soviet Germans") was an anti-religious magazine in German. It was published by the Central Bureau of the German Sections at the Central Committee of the Communist Party (Bolsheviks) of Ukraine in the city of Kharkiv. The first issue was published in November 1926, No. 2–11 − in 1927. In the years 1928–1929. 12 were published, in 1930–1933 - 24 issues a year, and in 1934 - 12 issues a year. The subscription price in 1928 was 25 kopeks per month. In 1927 the circulation of the magazine was 457, in 1928 - 1200, in 1929 - 1900, in 1930 - 2400 copies. The publication ceased at No. 12 for 1934. The chief editor of the magazine was Hans Gockel (Johann Gockel-Ehrlich; ; (1896–1938)) who was subsequently arrested in 1937 and shot in 1938, rehabilitated in 1959. The slogan of the magazine was "The struggle against religion is the struggle for socialism!".

References

Notes

 "DAS NEULAND" , antireligiöse Zeitschrift in deutscher Sprache.
 Влада і церква в Україні (перша половина ХХ століття). / Збірник наукових праць. / Укр. асоціація релігієзн.; / Ін-ту філософії ім. Г. С. Сковороди ; / Ред. кол. Пащенко В.О. та ін. / Полтава / 2000 / 135 с. / Стр. 117 / 
 Кравченко, П.; Сітарчук, Р. Протестантські об'єднання в Україні у контексті соціальної політики більшовиків 20-30-і роки ХХ століття. / Издательство: Полтава: АСМІ; 212 страниц; 2005 / Стр. 181
 Neuland : antireligiöse Zweiwochenschrift der deutschen Werktätigen.
 Воинствующее безбожие в СССР за 15 лет. 1917-1932 : сборник / Центральный совет Союза воинствующих безбожников и Институт философии Коммунистической академии ; под редакцией М. Енишерлова, А. Лукачевского, М. Митина. - Москва : ОГИЗ : Государственное антирелигиозное издательство, 1932. - 525, (2) с. : ил., портр.; 22 см. / С. 331
 T. D. Regehr, Jacob I. Regehr. For Everything a Season: A History of the Alexanderkrone Zentralschule./ CMBC Publications, 1988 / p. 137 

1934 disestablishments in the Soviet Union
1926 establishments in the Soviet Union
Anti-religious campaign in the Soviet Union
Anti-Christian sentiment in Europe
Anti-Christian sentiment in Asia
Atheism publications
Communist magazines
German-language magazines
Magazines established in 1926
Magazines disestablished in 1934
Magazines published in Moscow
Persecution of Muslims
Propaganda in the Soviet Union
Propaganda newspapers and magazines
Religious persecution by communists
Magazines published in the Soviet Union
Anti-Islam sentiment in the Soviet Union